Haque Academy is a co-educational school based in the Defence Housing Authority locality of Karachi in Pakistan. The school caters to students from the first grade up to O levels. Established in August 2008, it is designed around a central landscaped courtyard and consists of a large, purpose-built building with classrooms, science laboratories, a library, an art room, music room and auditorium. There is a large playground for sports and recreational activities. There are about 1000 students.

Mrs Haque's Nursery
The school is affiliated with and was established as institution to Mrs Haque's Nursery, a pre-school which provides early childhood education, catering to students from prep to kindergarten. Children who complete their preliminary education at Mrs Haque's Nursery may choose to move into the Haque Academy to continue further studies, as part of a smooth transition in the same education system.

Student life
Haque Academy is ranked number 3 in athletics in Sindh. Two more floors have been built. The school has extra-curricular activities like robotics, cooking, swimming, dancing, yoga and comic illustration as well as many others. The school has sports including football, cricket, table tennis, throw ball, and basketball. It has won numerous trophies in football throw ball and cricket.

References

External links
 Haque Academy - official homepage

Educational institutions established in 2008
Schools in Karachi
Montessori schools in Pakistan
2008 establishments in Pakistan